Kharkivskyi neighborhood, often referred to as Kharkivskyi masyv is located in the Darnytsia region of Kyiv, Ukraine. The area was first developed between the mid-1980s and early 1990s as an expansion of the Darnytsia neighborhood of the city. The name is rather symbolic than historic: it simply indicates that the area lies en route to the city of Kharkiv.

Formal subordination
The neighborhood was a part of the Kharkivskyi Raion (administrative district) of the city until 2004, along with the neighboring areas Osokorky, Poznyaky, Bortnychi and Chervonyi Hutir - which was and still is a little ambiguous. In 2004 all these neighborhoods were included in the Darnytsia Raion.

Architecture and infrastructure

Located on the south end of the Dnieper river's left bank, the Kharkivskyi was constructed following similar apartment block plans as the Obolon district. The very same method of sand-depositing was used to level and elevate the low-land meadows. The neighborhood has many lakes and the beaches are a popular attraction. However, the trees are rare and weak (because of the sand soil) despite intensive efforts of the residents.

Originally located relatively far from the metro, the neighborhood was not seen as prestigious, but the long waiting list for apartments caused quick settlement. 
At the time of initial development, the area contained relatively tall buildings, anywhere from nine to sixteen stories.

In the early to mid-1990s, the metro was extended to better cover the neighbourhood. Osokorky station was opened in 1992 and Kharkivska station was opened in 1994 .

Like in other areas of Kyiv, additional development began in Kharkivskyi in 2000. Modern, Western-style apartment buildings were built around the lakes, usually further towards the south and east ends of the neighborhood. The prestige of the area was also increased with the opening of shops, restaurants and cafes on and around the lakes as well as on the ground floors of apartment buildings. The metro is being extended deeper into the neighborhood, with new Boryspilska station opened in 2005, and a few more stations which were added subsequently.

Economy
Kharkivskyi is a 'dormitory' area specially designed as such. The only businesses found there are retail and entertainment, with no industry present.

Neighborhoods in Kyiv